The Motovun Film Festival is an annual film festival established in 1999 and held in the small town of Motovun, Croatia. It usually takes place over five or six days in late July or early August.

Overview

Motovun Film Festival is entirely dedicated to films made in small studios and independent film productions. Founded by film director Rajko Grlić and producer Boris T. Matić, it was first organized in the late 1990s to fill the gap in cinema repertoire as there were almost none non-Hollywood films in wide distribution in Croatia at the time. The festival program every year consists of around 70 titles from all over the world, from documentaries to feature films, short and feature-length films, from guerrilla-made films to co-productions.

Over time the festival become widely popular among Croatian youths, as well as foreign backpackers. Every year during the festival, a camp for visitors is organized on the foothills of Motovun, where anybody can put up a tent. The festivalgoers' camp has become one of the hallmarks of the festival. In January 2007 British newspaper The Guardian described the festival as "a cross between Glastonbury and Sundance." It is often referred to as "a Woodstock of film festivals".

The festival also grew in status on the festival circuit. From an event that was once considered a "backpacker's film festival," by 2007 it was recognized as one of the two most important film festivals held on the territory of the former Yugoslavia, along with the Sarajevo Film Festival.

The 2011 festival, which was supposed to be its 13th edition, was re-numbered by organizers as 14th, in order to skip the unlucky number 13. The skipped year was maintained in all later festival editions, so the most recent 2021 festival (held for the 23rd time) was officially designated as "24th Motovun Film Festival".

Awards
The main award at the festival is called Propeler Motovuna (inspired by the prominent wind turbines located near Motovun).

Other awards at the festival are the Motovun Online award for best short film, the odAdoA (From 'A' to 'A') award for best film in the regional competition (the name of the award is short for From Austria to Albania, roughly describing the region covered), and the film critics' FIPRESCI Award.

In 2008, the Motovun Maverick Award was introduced, given to notable filmmakers for lifetime achievement. Its first recipient was Ken Russell. In 2013, Mohsen Makhmalbaf and The Gardener were given the award.

Award winners

Propeller of Motovun

FIPRESCI Prize

Notable guests
People who visited the festival include:
 Dušan Makavejev
 Stephen Daldry
 Paul Thomas Anderson
 Ken Russell
 Vanessa Redgrave
 Amanda Plummer
 Mira Furlan
 Milena Dravić
 Jason Biggs 
 Jamie Bell

References

External links
 
Motovun Film Festival at the Internet Movie Database

Film festivals in Croatia
Film festivals established in 1999
1999 establishments in Croatia
Summer events in Croatia